Plucker is an offline Web and free e-book reader for Palm OS based handheld devices, Windows Mobile (Pocket PC) devices, and other PDAs.  Plucker contains POSIX tools, scripts, and "conduits" which work on Linux, Mac OS X, Microsoft Windows, and Unix. Web pages can be processed, compressed, and transferred to the PDA for viewing by the Plucker viewer.

Features
 Clickable images (with pan and zoom)
 Italic and narrow support
 High-resolution fonts
 Multiple concurrent documents (more than one copy of the same material)
 Configurable display options (rotation, configurable toolbars)
 Advanced stylus options (gestures and hardware button navigation)
 zlib and PalmDoc compression (in native and ARM optimized versions)
 Python, C++, and Perl distillers and scripts
 A Microsoft Windows graphical installer

Through the use of intelligent "distillers" written in many common languages (currently Python, C++ and Perl with third-party versions written in Java), content can be created for Plucker from many sources, including HTML, PDF, RDF, RSS, text files, and many other file formats

Plucker is licensed under the GNU General Public License and is free software.

See also 

Wikipedia:Snapshots - 2000 Wikipedia articles in Plucker format
FBReader - free FictionBook ebook reader which can view Plucker and HTML files.
 iSiloX
 Evernote
 Calibre

References

External links
 
Source code :
 SourceForge
 https://web.archive.org/web/20160810134237/https://code.google.com/archive/p/plucker/
 https://storage.googleapis.com/google-code-archive-source/v2/code.google.com/plucker/source-archive.zip
 https://github.com/arpruss/plucker
 https://web.archive.org/web/20060820142302/http://lists.rubberchicken.org/pipermail/plucker-announce/
 https://web.archive.org/web/20060820142148/http://lists.rubberchicken.org/pipermail/plucker-list/
 https://web.archive.org/web/20060820142319/http://lists.rubberchicken.org/pipermail/plucker-dev/
Sample Plucker documents - ebooks and other works.
Plucker Projects, aka "Plucker Workshop"
Vade-Mecum, Plucker viewer for Pocket PC.

 https://wiki.mobileread.com/wiki/Plucker
 https://sunrise.mobileread.com/
 https://sourceforge.net/projects/sunrisexp/files/Source/0.42j/
 https://wiki.mobileread.com/wiki/SunriseXP_reference
 https://wiki.mobileread.com/wiki/Web-clipping_software

Ebooks
Free web browsers